The Clásico RCN (Spanish for RCN Classic) is an annual cycling road race that takes place over many stages through different regions of Colombia during October. It is organized by the Colombian Cycling Federation.

The event is sponsored by Radio Cadena Nacional, which is one of the oldest and largest radio networks in Colombia, and by a network of Colombian business in Medellín "Empresas Públicas de Medellín". The Clásico RCN and the Vuelta a Colombia are the most important stage races in Colombia.

History
The first event was held in 1961 and was won by Rubén Darío Gómez. Many well-known Colombian cyclists have won the event, including Martín Emilio Rodríguez, Fabio Parra, Luis Herrera and Rafael Antonio Niño.

During the 1980s, the Clásico RCN held several "open" events in which professional cycling teams from Europe came and competed in the race. It has been written that the reason for this was for Elite professionals in Europe to get altitude training in the early season in Colombia. Some of the teams competing in the Clásico RCN during the eighties included Peugeot–Shell–Michelin, Renault–Elf–Gitane, Sem–France Loire, La Vie Claire, Zor and Reynolds which resulted in stage wins by Pascal Simon, Laurent Fignon, Bernard Hinault, Charly Mottet and Martial Gayant.

In the history of the event, there has been two times when the overall winner was later disqualified for doping. This happened in 1971 when Álvaro Pachón Morales was disqualified, and the win was given to Rafael Antonio Niño, and also in 1991 when Pablo Emilio Wilches Tumbia was disqualified with the win going to Fabio Hernán Rodríguez Hernández. There was a tragic accident in the 1985 edition of the race when Jorge Iván Ramírez fell during a stage and died later.

Although the Clásico RCN now occurs in October, past events have taken place in March, April, May and August. It began as a two-day event, but its duration and distance were increased and, in 2000, it consisted of ten stages.

Past winners

References

External links

Official site of Clasico RCN 

 
Cycle races in Colombia
Recurring sporting events established in 1961
Men's road bicycle races
1961 establishments in Colombia
Super Prestige Pernod races